The National People's Congress Financial and Economic Affairs Committee is one of nine special committees of the National People's Congress, the national legislature of the People's Republic of China. The special committee was created during the first session of the 6th National People's Congress in March 1983, and has existed in every National People's Congress since.

Chairpersons

References

Financial and Economic Affairs Committee